Robert Vicot (born 29 October 1931) is a French former professional football defender. He played for Ivry sur Seine, Bazar de l'Hôtel de Ville, Toulon and SO Le Lavandou.

Vicot coached SO Le Lavandou, Châteauroux, Paris SG, Rouen, Paris FC, Gabon and Béziers.

References

External links
Profile

1931 births
Living people
Association football defenders
French footballers
SC Toulon players
Ligue 2 players
French football managers
French expatriate football managers
LB Châteauroux managers
Paris Saint-Germain F.C. managers
FC Rouen managers
Paris FC managers
AS Béziers Hérault (football) managers
French expatriate sportspeople in Gabon
Expatriate football managers in Gabon
Gabon national football team managers